The white-toothed shrews or Crocidurinae are one of three subfamilies of the shrew family Soricidae.

The outer layer of these shrews' teeth is white, unlike that of the red-toothed shrews. These species are typically found in Africa and southern Europe and Asia. This subfamily includes the largest shrew, the Asian house shrew, Suncus murinus, at about 15 cm in length, and the smallest, the Etruscan shrew, Suncus etruscus, at about 3.5 cm in length and 2 grams in weight. The latter is possibly the world's smallest extant mammal, although some give this title to the bumblebee bat. Crocidura contains the most species of any mammal genus.

When young must be moved before they are independent, mother and young form a chain or "caravan" where each animal hangs on to the rear of the one in front. This behaviour has also been observed in some Sorex species.

List of species
Subfamily Crocidurinae
Genus Crocidura (white-toothed shrews)
Mysterious shrew, Crocidura abscondita
 Sanetti shrew, Crocidura afeworkbekelei
 Cyrenaica shrew, Crocidura aleksandrisi
 East African highland shrew, Crocidura allex
 Andaman shrew, Crocidura andamanensis
 Anhui white-toothed shrew, Crocidura anhuiensis
 Annamite shrew, Crocidura annamitensis
 Ansell's shrew, Crocidura ansellorum
 Arabian shrew, Crocidura arabica
 Jackass shrew, Crocidura arispa
 Armenian shrew, Crocidura armenica
 Asian gray shrew, Crocidura attenuata
 Hun shrew, Crocidura attila
 Bailey's shrew, Crocidura baileyi
 Kinabalu shrew, Crocidura baluensis
 Batak shrew, Crocidura batakorum
 Bates's shrew, Crocidura batesi
 Mindanao shrew, Crocidura beatus
 Beccari's shrew, Crocidura beccarii
 Bottego's shrew, Crocidura bottegi
 Bale shrew, Crocidura bottegoides
 Thick-tailed shrew, Crocidura brunnea
 Buettikofer's shrew, Crocidura buettikoferi
 African dusky shrew, Crocidura caliginea
 Canarian shrew, Crocidura canariensis
 Caspian shrew, Crocidura caspica
 Sulawesi hairy-tailed shrew, Crocidura caudipilosa
 Cinderella shrew, Crocidura cinderella
 Congo white-toothed shrew, Crocidura congobelgica
 Cranbrook's shrew, Crocidura cranbooki
 Long-footed shrew, Crocidura crenata
 Crosse's shrew, Crocidura crossei
 Reddish-gray musk shrew, Crocidura cyanea
 Dent's shrew, Crocidura denti
 Desperate shrew, Crocidura desperata
 Dhofar shrew, Crocidura dhofarensis
 Long-tailed musk shrew, Crocidura dolichura
 Dongjiangyuan white-toothed shrew, Crocidura dongyangjiangensis
 Doucet's musk shrew, Crocidura douceti
 Dracula shrew, Crocidura dracula
 Dsinezumi shrew, Crocidura dsinezumi
 Ivory Coast white-toothed shrew, Crocidura eburnea
 Eisentraut's shrew, Crocidura eisentrauti
 Elgon shrew, Crocidura elgonius
 Elongated shrew, Crocidura elongata
 Heather shrew, Crocidura erica
 Fingui white-toothed shrew, Crocidura fingui
 Fischer's shrew, Crocidura fischeri
 Greater red musk shrew, Crocidura flavescens
 Flower's shrew, Crocidura floweri
 Bornean shrew, Crocidura foetida
 Fox's shrew, Crocidura foxi
 Southeast Asian shrew, Crocidura fuliginosa
 Savanna shrew, Crocidura fulvastra
 Smoky white-toothed shrew, Crocidura fumosa
 Bicolored musk shrew, Crocidura fuscomurina
 Gathorne's shrew, Crocidura gathornei
 Glass's shrew, Crocidura glassi
 Gmelin's white-toothed shrew, Crocidura gmelini
 Goliath shrew, Crocidura goliath
 Peters's musk shrew, Crocidura gracilipes
 Large-headed shrew, Crocidura grandiceps
 Greater Mindanao shrew, Crocidura grandis
 Grasse's shrew, Crocidura grassei
 Luzon shrew, Crocidura grayi
 Greenwood's shrew, Crocidura greenwoodi
 Güldenstädt's shrew, Crocidura gueldenstaedtii
 Guy's shrew, Crocidura guy
 Harenna shrew, Crocidura harenna
 Sinharaja shrew, Crocidura hikmiya*
 Hildegarde's shrew, Crocidura hildegardeae
 Hill's shrew, Crocidura hilliana
 Lesser red musk shrew, Crocidura hirta
 Andaman spiny shrew, Crocidura hispida
 Horsfield's shrew, Crocidura horsfieldii
 Hutan shrew, Crocidura hutanis
 Indochinese shrew, Crocidura indochinensis
 Jackson's shrew, Crocidura jacksoni
 Jenkins' shrew, Crocidura jenkinsi
 Jouvenet's shrew, Crocidura jouvenetae
 Katinka's shrew, Crocidura katinka
 Kego shrew, Crocidura kegoensis
 Kivu shrew, Crocidura kivuana
 Lamotte's shrew, Crocidura lamottei
 Kivu long-haired shrew, Crocidura lanosa
 Ussuri white-toothed shrew, Crocidura lasiura
 Latona's shrew, Crocidura latona
 Sulawesi shrew, Crocidura lea
 Sumatran giant shrew, Crocidura lepidura
 Bicolored shrew, Crocidura leucodon
 Sulawesi tiny shrew, Crocidura levicula
 Naked-tail shrew, Crocidura littoralis
 Savanna swamp shrew, Crocidura longipes
 Lucina's shrew, Crocidura lucina
 Ludia's shrew, Crocidura ludia
 Moonshine shrew(Crocidura luna
 Mauritanian shrew, Crocidura lusitania
 Lwiro shrew, Crocidura lwiroensis
 MacArthur's shrew, Crocidura macarthuri
 MacMillan's shrew, Crocidura macmillani
 Nyiro shrew, Crocidura macowi
 Malayan shrew, Crocidura malayana
 Manenguba shrew, Crocidura manengubae
 Makwassie musk shrew, Crocidura maquassiensis
 Swamp musk shrew, Crocidura mariquensis
 Gracile naked-tailed shrew, Crocidura maurisca
 Javanese shrew, Crocidura maxi
 Mduma's shrew, Crocidura mdumai
 Mindoro shrew, Crocidura mindorus
 Sri Lankan long-tailed shrew, Crocidura miya
 Kilimanjaro shrew, Crocidura monax
 Sunda shrew, Crocidura monticola
 Montane white-toothed shrew, Crocidura montis
 Munissi’s shrew, Crocidura munissii
 West African long-tailed shrew, Crocidura muricauda
 Mossy forest shrew, Crocidura musseri
 Ugandan musk shrew, Crocidura mutesae
 Somali dwarf shrew, Crocidura nana
 Savanna dwarf shrew, Crocidura nanilla
 Narcondam shrew, Crocidura narcondamica
 Sumatran white-toothed shrew, Crocidura neglecta
 Peninsular shrew, Crocidura negligens
 Negros shrew, Crocidura negrina
 Newmark's shrew, Crocidura newmarki
 Nicobar shrew, Crocidura nicobarica
 Nigerian shrew, Crocidura nigeriae
 Blackish white-toothed shrew, Crocidura nigricans
 Black-footed shrew, Crocidura nigripes
 African black shrew, Crocidura nigrofusca
 Nimba shrew, Crocidura nimbae
 Nimba giant shrew, Crocidura nimbasilvanus
 Sibuyan shrew, Crocidura ninoyi
 Niobe's shrew, Crocidura niobe
 West African pygmy shrew, Crocidura obscurior
 African giant shrew, Crocidura olivieri
 Oriental shrew, Crocidura orientalis
 Ryukyu shrew, Crocidura orii
 North African white-toothed shrew, Crocidura pachyura
 Palawan shrew, Crocidura palawanensis
 Panay shrew, Crocidura panayensis
 Sumatran long-tailed shrew, Crocidura paradoxura
 Small-footed shrew, Crocidura parvipes
 Sahelian tiny shrew, Crocidura pasha
 Pale gray shrew, Crocidura pergrisea
 Guramba shrew, Crocidura phaeura
 Dr. Phan Luong shrew, Crocidura phanluongi
 Phu Hoc shrew, Crocidura phuquocensis
 Cameroonian shrew, Crocidura picea
 Pitman's shrew, Crocidura pitmani
 Flat-headed shrew, Crocidura planiceps
 Fraser's musk shrew, Crocidura poensis
 Polia's shrew, Crocidura polia
 Kashmir white-toothed shrew, Crocidura pullata
 Rainey's shrew, Crocidura raineyi
 Negev shrew, Crocidura ramona
 Chinese white-toothed shrew, Crocidura rapax
 Egyptian pygmy shrew, Crocidura religiosa
 Sulawesi white-handed shrew, Crocidura rhoditis
 Roosevelt's shrew, Crocidura roosevelti
 Greater white-toothed shrew, Crocidura russula
 Sa Pa shrew, Crocidura sapaensis
 Ugandan lowland shrew, Crocidura selina
 Lesser rock shrew, Crocidura serezkyensis
 Asian lesser white-toothed shrew, Crocidura shantungensis
 Siberian shrew, Crocidura sibirica
 Sicilian shrew, Crocidura sicula
 Lesser gray-brown musk shrew, Crocidura silacea
 Mebado white-toothed shrew, Crocidura similturba
 Desert musk shrew, Crocidura smithii
 Sokolov's shrew, Crocidura sokolovi
 Somali shrew, Crocidura somalica
 Narrow-headed shrew, Crocidura stenocephala
 Lesser white-toothed shrew, Crocidura suaveolens
 Iranian shrew, Crocidura susiana
 Taiwanese gray shrew, Crocidura tanakae
 Tanzanian shrew, Crocidura tansaniana
 Tarella shrew, Crocidura tarella
 Saharan shrew, Crocidura tarfayensis
 Telford's shrew, Crocidura telfordi
 Timor shrew, Crocidura tenuis
 Thalia's shrew, Crocidura thalia
 Therese's shrew, Crocidura theresae
 São Tomé shrew, Crocidura thomensis
 Christmas Island shrew, Crocidura trichura
 Turbo shrew, Crocidura turba
 Ultimate shrew, Crocidura ultima
 Javan ghost shrew, Crocidura umbra
 Usambara shrew, Crocidura usambarae
 Savanna path shrew, Crocidura viaria
 Mamfe shrew, Crocidura virgata
 Voi shrew, Crocidura voi
 Voracious shrew, Crocidura vorax
 Banka shrew, Crocidura vosmaeri
 Lesser Ryukyu shrew, Crocidura watasei
 Whitaker's shrew, Crocidura whitakeri
 Wimmer's shrew, Crocidura wimmeri
 Hainan Island shrew, Crocidura wuchihensis
 Xanthippe's shrew, Crocidura xantippe
 Beletta shrew, Crocidura yaldeni
 Yankari shrew, Crocidura yankariensis
 Mikhail Zaitsev’s shrew, Crocidura zaitsevi*
 Zaphir's shrew, Crocidura zaphiri
 Zarudny's rock shrew, Crocidura zarudnyi
 Upemba shrew, Crocidura zimmeri
 Cretan shrew, Crocidura zimmermanni
Genus Diplomesodon
Piebald shrew, Diplomesodon pulchellum
Genus Feroculus
Kelaart's long-clawed shrew, Feroculus feroculus
Genus Palawanosorex
Palawan moss shrew, Palawanosorex muscorum
Genus Paracrocidura (large-headed shrews)
Grauer's large-headed shrew, Paracrocidura graueri
Greater large-headed shrew, Paracrocidura maxima
Lesser large-headed shrew, Paracrocidura schoutedeni
Genus Ruwenzorisorex
Ruwenzori shrew, Ruwenzorisorex suncoides
Genus Scutisorex
Armored shrew, Scutisorex somereni
Thor's hero shrew, Scutisorex thori
Genus Solisorex
Pearson's long-clawed shrew, Solisorex pearsoni
Genus Suncus
Taita shrew, Suncus aequatorius
Black shrew, Suncus ater
Day's shrew, Suncus dayi
Etruscan shrew, Suncus etruscus
Sri Lankan shrew, Suncus fellowesgordoni
Bornean pygmy shrew, Suncus hosei
Hutu-Tutsi dwarf shrew, Suncus hututsi
Least dwarf shrew, Suncus infinitesimus
Greater dwarf shrew, Suncus lixa
Madagascan pygmy shrew, Suncus madagascariensis
Malayan pygmy shrew, Suncus malayanus
Climbing shrew, Suncus megalurus
Flores shrew, Suncus mertensi
Asian highland shrew, Suncus montanus
Asian house shrew, Suncus murinus
Remy's pygmy shrew, Suncus remyi
Anderson's shrew, Suncus stoliczkanus
Lesser dwarf shrew, Suncus varilla
Jungle shrew, Suncus zeylanicus
Genus Sylvisorex, forest shrews
Akaibe's forest shrew, Sylvisorex akaibei
Cameroonian forest shrew, Sylvisorex cameruniensis
Corbet's forest shrew, Sylvisorex corbeti
Grant's forest shrew, Sylvisorex granti
Howell's forest shrew, Sylvisorex howelli
Bioko forest shrew, Sylvisorex isabellae
Johnston's forest shrew, Sylvisorex johnstoni
Kongana shrew, Sylvisorex konganensis
Moon forest shrew, Sylvisorex lunaris
Mount Cameroon forest shrew, Sylvisorex morio
Greater forest shrew, Sylvisorex ollula
Lesser forest shrew, Sylvisorex oriundus
Rain forest shrew, Sylvisorex pluvialis
Bamenda forest shrew, Sylvisorex silvanorum
Volcano shrew, Sylvisorex vulcanorum

See also
 Imjin virus

References

White-toothed shrews